Deshabandu Indradasa Hettiarachchi (born 13 October 1927) was a Sri Lankan politician and the former Minister of Industries.

Hettiarachchi was born 13 October 1927 in Kalutara, the son of a tea, rubber and coconut planter, to a family with five sisters and two brothers. The family moved to Horana, where he attended Ananda and Nalanda Colleges, before completing his studies at Pembroke (a defunct ‘finishing school’). He contested and won a seat on the Horana Village Council and a year later, following the resignation of the sitting chairman, Hettiarchchi was appointed to the position, which he held for the next eighteen years.

He was elected as a Member of Parliament, representing Horana at the 8th parliamentary election held on 21 July 1977.

In 2005 he was conferred with the title of Deshabandu by the President.

References

1927 births
Living people
United National Party politicians
Sri Lankan Buddhists
Alumni of Nalanda College, Colombo
Members of the 8th Parliament of Sri Lanka
Members of the 9th Parliament of Sri Lanka
Ministers of state of Sri Lanka
Non-cabinet ministers of Sri Lanka
District ministers of Sri Lanka
Deshabandu
Sinhalese politicians